Jesse Allen White (born 19 April 1986) is a retired American professional wrestler and former football player. During his time in WWE's developmental territories, he wrestled as Jake Carter. He is a second generation professional wrestler; his father, Leon White, competed in professional wrestling as Big Van Vader. He is also a former college football player, having played college football for the University of Oklahoma before retiring due to injuries.

Professional wrestling career
White, like his father (known in professional wrestling as Big Van Vader), first embarked on a football career before trying out at professional wrestling. He joined the University of Oklahoma's football team in 2005. Hip and back injuries ended his career almost as soon as it began, but White stayed involved as a student coach for the team.

White then moved on to training to become a professional wrestler under the tutelage of his father. He wrestled matches in Japan while teaming with his father in 2010 and 2011.

WWE

Florida Championship Wrestling (2011–2012)
It was reported on 30 April 2011, that White had signed a developmental contract with WWE. White made his televised debut for WWE's developmental territory, Florida Championship Wrestling, on the 18 March 2012 episode of FCW TV, where he was paired with Corey Graves. On the 1 April FCW TV originally taped on 15 March, Carter won the Florida Tag Team Championship with Graves by defeating Bo Dallas and Husky Harris. On the 22 April FCW TV, Carter and Graves retained their title against Mike Dalton and CJ Parker. On the final FCW TV on 15 July, Carter and Graves defeated Dalton and Parker again to retain their title.

NXT (2012–2013)
When WWE rebranded its FCW into NXT, Carter's NXT television debut took place on the 4 July episode of the rebooted NXT taped at Full Sail University, where he and Graves defeated CJ Parker and Nick Rogers. After a quiet dissociation from Graves, Carter would find himself winless in televised NXT matches, which even saw Graves himself defeating Carter on the 23 January 2013 episode of NXT. Carter returned to NXT on 30 May 2013, where Carter and Brandon Traven faced Garrett Dylan and Scott Dawson in a losing effort. on the 19 June episode of NXT, Carter faced Xavier Woods in a losing effort. on 12 September episode of NXT, Carter faced Tensai in a losing effort, which turned out to be his final match with WWE.

Championships and accomplishments
Florida Championship Wrestling
FCW Florida Tag Team Championship (1 time) – with Corey Graves

References

External links

 

1986 births
Living people
American male professional wrestlers
Oklahoma Sooners football players
Players of American football from Denver
Professional wrestlers from Colorado
Sportspeople from Denver
FCW Florida Tag Team Champions